The 1930 Western Illinois Purple and Gold football team represented Western Illinois University in the 1903 college football season as an independent. In the first season in school history, Western Illinois compiled a 0–2–1 record. Their head coach was unknown.

Schedule

References

Western Illinois
Western Illinois Leathernecks football seasons
Western Illinois Leathernecks football
College football winless seasons